Ruth Ann Jamnick (born November 8, 1941) was a Democratic member of the Michigan House of Representatives. Prior to her election to the House, Jamnick served 22 years as the Ypsilanti Township Treasurer, and she served one term as that township's supervisor following her time in the House.

Jamnick also served as a member of the State Boundary Commission from 2005 to 2013. She was also a member of the Washtenaw County chapter of the Michigan Townships Association and as the association's second vice president. Jamnick was the Ypsilanti Township delegate to the Southeast Michigan Council of Governments (SEMCOG), and is a past chair of the Washtenaw County United Way.

References

Living people
1941 births
Politicians from Ypsilanti, Michigan
Women state legislators in Michigan
Democratic Party members of the Michigan House of Representatives
20th-century American politicians
20th-century American women politicians
21st-century American politicians
21st-century American women politicians